The Bread and Freedom Party (Hizb AlEish WaAlHorria), also translated as the Bread and Liberty Party, is a democratic socialist party in Egypt created by former members of the Socialist Popular Alliance Party. The party is not registered as of 10 February 2014.

280 members from the Socialist Popular Alliance Party gave their resignations in early November 2013, though the resignations were rejected by Abdel Ghafar Shukr, the head of the party. The Daily News Egypt site gives the number of resigning members as 304. The resigning members criticized their former party for aligning itself with the military during the transitional period and defending the actions of the police. The policies of the Bread and Freedom Party include wealth redistribution and development.

References

2013 establishments in Egypt
Organisations of the Egyptian Crisis (2011–2014)
Political parties established in 2013
Political parties in Egypt
Socialist parties in Egypt